Cercopagididae is a family of crustaceans belonging to the order Diplostraca. A lot of Cercopagididae species are non-native species, many of which pose a great threat to aquatic ecosystems.

Genera:

 Blythotrephes Leydig, 1860 (e.g. Bythotrephes longimanus
 Cercopagis Sars, 1897 (e.g. Cercopagis pengoi

In addition, * Apagis Sars, 1897 is sometimes treated as a genus rather than as a subgenus, Cercopagis (Apagis).

References

Diplostraca
Crustacean families